Matthew Nettheim (born 26 June 1969) is an Australian photographer specialising in on-set feature film stills photography. In 2005 The Australian newspaper counted Nettheim, along with Mark Rogers and Elise Lockwood, as one of approximately one dozen regular film stills photographers in the Australian market.

Nettheim took the period still shots of recreated crime scenes used in ABC's 2006 television drama The Silence.


Credits

Film
Hot Fuzz
The Quiet American
Rabbit Proof Fence
Little Fish
Where the Wild Things Are
Another Country

Television
The Silence

References

External links

Living people
1969 births
Australian photographers